Columbia Grammar & Preparatory School ("Columbia Grammar", "Columbia Prep", "CGPS", "Columbia") is the oldest nonsectarian independent school in New York City, located on the Upper West Side of Manhattan (5 West 93rd Street). The school serves grades Pre-kindergarten to 12 and offers a college preparatory curriculum.

It was founded in 1764 by what is now Columbia University to teach future freshmen English, Greek, and Latin grammar. The school was originally called The Grammar School of King's College, after the original name of Columbia University. When the college changed its name during the American Revolution, so did the school, to Columbia Grammar School.

The school dissolved its formal ties with Columbia in 1865. The word "preparatory" was added in 1969.

The school has existed in several locations. In 1907, the school moved to its current location on 93rd Street, off Central Park West. Originally consisting of one building, it added five brownstones through its 1956 merger with the adjacent Leonard School for Girls. A building across the street was built in 1984, followed by two more in 1997 and 2001. An administration building was added to the school in 2009. In the past 20 years, the size of the graduating class has more than doubled from about 45 to about 125.

History

The school was founded in 1764 by the 10-year-old King's College as a preparatory school. It ran for 100 years under the direct auspices of the college.

One of the most illustrious headmasters during that period was Charles Anthon, one of America's earliest and most distinguished classical scholars. During his tenure, the Grammar School provided over half the students to Columbia College's freshman class.

In 1864, when Anthon retired as headmaster, the trustees of Columbia College ended their relationship with the Grammar School and the school became a proprietary institution. It would gain nonprofit status in 1941.

In 1937, the Leonard School for Girls was founded, using several interconnected brownstones on West 94th Street (now part of the lower school). The school joined with the Grammar School in 1956 to become a coed institution.

Richard J. Soghoian, who became the school's 13th headmaster in 1981, guided the physical expansion of the school from its 1906 home at 5 West 93rd Street to the present complex, which totals  with 14 buildings between 92nd and 94th streets. Soghoian retired in 2017.

In 2017, William Donohue was headmaster, Sarah McLean was the Grammar School director (a predecessor, Stanley Seidman, retired in 2010), Paul Baly was the Middle School director, and Joanie Dean was the Prep School director.

Accreditation
Columbia Grammar & Preparatory School is a fully independent, non-sectarian school governed by a board of trustees composed of alumni and parents. The school is accredited by the New York State Association of Independent Schools, the Middle States Association of Colleges and Schools, and the New York State Board of Regents.

The school is a member of the Independent School Admissions Association of Greater New York (ISAAGNY).

Campus

In 1984, the school built a new Preparatory School at 4 West 93rd, containing a full-sized gymnasium, three science labs, state-of-the art computer lab, library, three music studios, and nine classrooms.

Columbia Grammar & Preparatory School greatly expanded its physical plant after 1985. Three new buildings and a fully renovated brownstone have, together with the existing buildings, added academic facilities as well as two new theaters, several computer labs, a variety of art studios and space for a growing music program. The Grammar School is located in a series of five interconnecting brownstones on 94th Street just off Central Park, and the 1905 Columbia Grammar School building at 5 West 93rd Street. In addition to classrooms, these house two libraries, two art studios, a gymnasium, swimming pool, two music studios, a science lab, a computer lab, and the Grammar School cafeteria.

In 1996, 36 West 93rd Street was completed, adding  of space to the physical plant. This building, which goes through from 93rd to 92nd Street, has two computer labs, five art studios, library, science labs, and classrooms for grades 5 and 6, a fully equipped theater, and a large cafeteria.

In September 2001, the school added five classrooms, another full-sized gym, a state-of-the-art theater, and three floors of classrooms and science labs.

Since then, many brownstones have been added, one entirely for offices, and one building dedicated to the arts. A walkway has been built behind the multiple brownstones to make them easier to navigate. In 2009, CGPS purchased several new brownstones, one entirely for the kindergarten, another for a science building, and one for administrative offices. The Prep School also added a new level to its library.

The new CGPS Middle School opened its doors to students in grades 5, 6 and 7 on Thursday, September 8, 2016. Two floors were added to the existing 36 West 93rd Street building to create a 6th and 7th floor solely for these grades, while the remainder of the building has been renovated. The ground floor now features an expansive yoga and dance studio; the existing Prep School cafeteria has been renovated and a second floor cafeteria was added specifically for Middle School students. New art studios as well as a new library, three science labs, a rooftop play yard and twelve classrooms have been added to the building. The HVAC system has been updated and the building is fully handicap-accessible.

Headmasters 
 Matthew Cushing (1764–1772) 
 Alexander Leslie (1772–1776) 
 William Cochran (1784–1788) 
 Joseph Nelson (1788–1828) 
 John D. Ogilby (1828–1830) 
 Dr. Charles Anthon (1830–1864) 
 George W. Bacon (1864–1869) 
 Richard S. Bacon (1864–1892) 
 Benjamin H. Campbell (1869–1920) 
 George A. Kohut (1920–1933) 
 Frederic A. Alden (1920–1956), Headmaster emeritus (1956–1964) 
 James W. Stern (1956–1980)
 Dr. Richard Soghoian (1981–2017)
 Dr. William Donohue (2018–present)

Athletic championships

Columbia Prep athletics teams participate in the New York City Athletic League (NYCAL).

Cross Country
 Boys League Championships: 1991, 2009, 2010, 2013, 2014, 2015
 Girls League Championships: 1991, 1994, 1995, 2005, 2008, 2009, 2017

Soccer
 Boys League Championships: 1987, 1991, 1996, 2000, 2004, 2009, 2010, 2011, 2012
 Boys League Tournament Championships: 1997, 2002, 2005, 2009, 2010, 2012
 Girls League Championships: 2011, 2012, 2013, 2014, 2015, 2016, 2017, 2018
 Girls League Tournament Championships: 2011, 2012, 2013, 2014, 2015, 2016, 2018

Tennis
 Boys League Championships: 2004, 2007, 2008, 2009, 2010, 2013, 2014, 2016
 Boys League Tournament Championships: 2003, 2004, 2006, 2009, 2010, 2014, 2015, 2016
 Girls League Championships: 1988, 1990, 1993, 2017
 Girls League Tournament Champions: 2016, 2017

Volleyball
 League Championships: 1992, 2000, 2003, 2011, 2015
 League Tournament Championships: 2011

Basketball
 Boys League Championships: 1990, 1995, 1997, 2001, 2009, 2010, 2011, 2012, 2014, 2016, 2020
 Boys League Tournament Championships: 1995, 1997, 2001, 2006, 2010, 2012, 2013, 2014, 2015
 Girls League Championships: 1988, 1994, 2001, 2012, 2016, 2017, 2018
 Girls League Tournament Championships: 1995, 2001, 2015, 2016, 2018

Ice Hockey
 Boys League Championships: 2016
 Boys League Tournament Championships: 2012, 2016, 2017

Swimming
 Boys League Championships: 2017, 2018, 2019
 Boys League Tournament Championships: 2017, 2019
 Girls League Championships: 2012, 2013, 2014, 2015, 2017
 Girls League Tournament Championships: 2012, 2013, 2014, 2015, 2016

Baseball
 League Championships: 1988, 1989, 1990, 1992, 1993, 1996, 2005, 2006, 2007, 2008, 2009, 2011, 2012, 2013, 2014, 2016, 2017
 League Tournament Championships: 1988, 1989, 1990, 1992, 1993, 2005, 2006, 2008 2012, 2013, 2014

Golf
 League Championships: 2001, 2004, 2009, 2010, 2013, 2014, 2015, 2016, 2017, 2018
 Tournament Championships: 2004, 2010, 2013, 2014, 2015, 2016

Softball
 League Championships: 1997, 2001, 2002, 2003, 2006, 2013, 2017, 2018
 Tournament Championships: 2004, 2017, 2018

Track & Field
 Boys League Championships: 1990, 1991, 2007, 2010, 2011, 2014, 2018, 2019
 Girls League Championships: 2001, 2002, 2011

Graduation requirements
In order for a student to graduate from CGPS, the following requirements must be fulfilled between 9th and 12th grades:
 8 semesters of English (Students must take at least one course in American Literature, World Literature, and Pre-Twentieth Century Literature during their junior and senior years)
 8 semesters of History
 6 semesters of Mathematics
 6 semesters of Science
 6 semesters of World Language
 6 semesters of Physical Education
1 semester of Art
 1 semester of Arts History (Students can choose between the following courses: Western Art History, Global Art History, Music History, and The History of American Musical Theater)
 1 semester of Technology

Students must also complete 60 hours of Community Service.

Notable alumni

 Felix Adler – Jewish leader who founded the Ethical Culture movement
 Richard Adler – lyricist, writer, composer and producer
 Marc Tyler Arnold – chess grandmaster
 Charles Benenson – real estate developer and investor
 Jeremy Bernstein – scientist and writer
 John Vernou Bouvier III – stockbroker and father of Jackie Onassis 
Calvin G. Child – former Judge and US Attorney for Connecticut 
Francis Pharcellus Church — journalist, author of "Yes, Virginia, there is a Santa Claus" 
 George Gosman DeWitt – philanthropist and lawyer
Abram J. Dittenhoefer – lawyer and judge
 Thomas C. E. Ecclesine – New York State Senator
 George L. Engel – psychiatrist who formulated the biopsychosocial model
 Bernard M. L. Ernst – American lawyer and magician
 John Erskine – professor at Columbia University
 Francis Blackwell Forbes – botanist and opium trader
 Josh Fox – filmmaker (HBO documentaries Gasland, Gasland Part II), theatre director, founder of International Wow Company.
 Peter Gelb – general manager of the Metropolitan Opera 
 Murray Gell-Mann (valedictorian) – Nobel Prize winner for the discovery of quarks and other subatomic particles.
 Sarah Michelle Gellar – actress (attended through 8th grade)
 Scott Goldstein – television and film writer, producer and director
 Richard James Horatio Gottheil – Jewish scholar and Zionist
 Harry Frank Guggenheim – businessman and aviator
 Zack Hample – Major League Baseball collector, who caught Alex Rodriguez's 3,000th career hit and Mike Trout's first career home run.
 Lorenz Hart – lyricist who worked with Richard Rogers
 Hamilton Holt – former president of Rollins College
 Daniel Riggs Huntington – architect
 Gabriel Katzka – theater, film, and television producer
 Nicholas Kaufmann – author
 Edward King – President of New York Stock Exchange; 34th President of Saint Nicholas Society of the City of New York
 Rufus King – Civil War union brigadier general
 Jeff Klein - hotelier and real estate developer
 Alex Kotlowitz – author and filmmaker
 Emile Henry Lacombe – United States Circuit Judge of the United States Court of Appeals
 Julius Gareché Lay – United States Ambassador to Honduras and Uruguay
 Sam A. Lewisohn – first president of the American Management Association
 Alfred Lilienthal – critic of Zionism
 Herman Melville – author of Moby-Dick  (attended through 6th grade)
 William Dennistoun Murphy – 47th President of Saint Nicholas Society of the City of New York
 Hans Niemann – chess grandmaster
 John Dyneley Prince – leader of both houses of the New Jersey Legislature
 John Podhoretz  – political columnist and film critic
 Susan Poser - President of Hofstra University (attended through 8th grade)
 The Postelles – Indie rock band, whose members attended Columbia Prep.
 T.J. Oakley Rhinelander – real estate magnate
 Nicole Ross (born 1989) - Olympic foil fencer
 Steve Ross – former CEO of Time Warner
 Jacob Ruppert – New York representative and owner of New York Yankees
 Haley Sacks - financial influencer known as MrsDowJones
 Benny Safdie – filmmaker
 Josh Safdie – filmmaker
 Ben Schnetzer – actor
 Edwin Robert Anderson Seligman – economist
 Isaac Newton Seligman – banker and social reformist
 Julius Seligson (1909–1987) – tennis player
 Ally Sheedy (born 1962) – actress known for her role of Allison Reynolds in The Breakfast Club
 Stephen Shore – photographer who pioneered the use of color in art photography
 David Stearns – General Manager of the Milwaukee Brewers.
 John Stone Stone – inventor
 Oscar Straus – United States Secretary of Commerce and Labor under Theodore Roosevelt
 George Templeton Strong – diarist and lawyer 
 Rod Thorn – President of the Philadelphia 76ers (attended through 8th grade)
 Jeffrey Toobin – former legal analyst for CNN and The New Yorker
 Dwight Townsend – New York Congressman
 Oliver A. Unger – motion picture and television producer, distributor and exhibitor
 Rainer Weiss – Professor Emeritus at MIT and 2017 Nobel Prize winner (Physics)
 Richard Grant White – musical critic and scholar
 Gary Winick – director of Tadpole, 13 Going on 30, and Charlotte's Web (2006 version)
 David Wolper – television producer, Roots and Willy Wonka & the Chocolate Factory
 Lee S. Wolosky – former U.S. Special Envoy for Guantanamo Closure
 Eugene Paul Ullman – impressionist painter

Notable teachers

 Joel Benjamin – Chess grandmaster and 3 time U.S. Chess Champion. U.S. Open champion in 1985.
 Henry Churchill de Mille – Businessman and theater actor and playwright.   
 Albert Field –  Dalí archivist.
 Fiorello H. La Guardia – 99th Mayor of New York City and 4-term Congressman.
 Andrew Lippa – Author and theater composer, lyricist, performer, and producer.
 Michael Rohde – U.S. chess grandmaster and attorney at law. U.S. Open champion in 1991.
 Marvin Terban – Children's book author.
 Marvin Vincent – Presbyterian minister and professor of classics and New Testament exegesis and criticism.

References

External links
 

Private K-12 schools in Manhattan
Preparatory schools in New York City
Educational institutions established in 1764
Upper West Side
1764 establishments in the Province of New York
Columbia University